The Philippine Dragon Boat Federation is the national team sports federation for dragon boat racing in the Philippines. The Philippine Dragon Boat Federation is one of the founding members of the International Dragon Boat Federation (IDBF) and recognized by the IDBF as the specific Governing Body for Dragon Boat racing in the Philippines. It is also a member of the South East Asian Traditional Boat Federation and the Asian Dragon Boat Federation. It succeeded the Amateur Rowing Association of the Philippines, as the responsible body for handling dragon boat teams in the country.

The PDBF and their member national teams used to be recognized by the Philippine Olympic Committee and the Philippine Sports Commission. But in a politically doubtful move, amid its standing world records, and despite its stellar performance as a national sports association, POC and PSC support was withdrawn, leading to the recognition of a canoeing and kayaking sports organization as NSA for dragon boat. 

Despite withdrawal of POC and PSC recognition, sans due process required by the POC bylaws, the International Dragon Boat Federation, the Asian Dragon Boat Federation, and the South East Asian Traditional Boat Federation continue to recognize the PDBF as the sole national governing body for dragon boat sport in the Philippines up to this day. As a private organization, the PDBF continues to win and represent the Philippines in world championships and international dragon boat competitions.

Members

External links
 https://www.facebook.com/epdbf
https://pdbfsport.com

References

Dragon
Dragon boat racing in the Philippines
2003 establishments in the Philippines